Kyzyl Vostok (Qıźıl Vostok) is a rural locality (a village) in Nizhnekaryshevsky Selsoviet, Baltachevsky District, Bashkortostan, Russia. The population was 43 as of 2010. There is 1 street.

Geography 
Kyzyl Vostok is located 32 km south of Starobaltachevo (the district's administrative centre) by road. Kyzyl-Kul is the nearest rural locality.

References 

Rural localities in Baltachevsky District